The 1935–36 season was the 59th Scottish football season in which Dumbarton competed at national level, entering the Scottish Football League and the Scottish Cup. In addition Dumbarton competed in the Dumbartonshire Cup.

Scottish League

Dumbarton's slump continued in their 14th successive season in the Second Division, by finishing 18th and bottom, with just 16 points - 43 behind champions Falkirk.  The transfer of Johnny Haddow to Falkirk in November was a huge loss and just one further win was registered all season.  Heavy defeats were again a feature, and for the first time Dumbarton conceded over 100 goals in the league in a single season.

Promotion/relegation Election
With there being no applicants for admission to the Second Division, the bottom two clubs - Raith Rovers and Dumbarton - maintained their league status.

Scottish Cup

This season there was a third round exit, to First Division Third Lanark.

Dumbartonshire Cup
There was some cheer when Dumbarton regained the Dumbartonshire Cup, with victory over non-league side Vale Ocaba.

Friendly

Player statistics

|}

Source:

Transfers

Players in

Players out 

In addition Richard English, Robert Henderson, Robert Kyle, William McDonald, James Mcleod, Allan Miller, Archie Milliken, Hugh Moran, James Muir, Edwin Powell, John Pyper and John Rodger all played their last games in Dumbarton 'colours'.

Source:

References

Dumbarton F.C. seasons
Scottish football clubs 1935–36 season